Ampelokampos (Greek: Αμπελόκαμπος) is a village in the municipal unit of Amaliada, northern Elis, Greece. It is situated in the plains near the Ionian Sea, 2 km northeast of Savalia, 5 km northwest of Amaliada and 5 km southeast of Gastouni. The railway from Patras to Pyrgos runs south of the village.

See also
List of settlements in Elis

External links
Amaliada City Web Portal - NEW- www.amaliada.net
Η Διαδικτυακή Πύλη της Αμαλιάδας - ΝΕΑ- www.amaliada.net
GTP - Ampelokampos

References

Populated places in Elis